Topola Ridge (‘Hrebet Topola’ \'hre-bet to-'po-la\) is the 9 km long mostly ice-covered, narrow rocky ridge on Davis Coast in Graham Land, Antarctica, rising to 1664 m at its south extremity. It is situated on the northwest side of Detroit Plateau, abuts Zabernovo Bastion on the south, extending northwards to Matov Peak and ending in Hargrave Hill. The feature surmounts some tributaries to Wright Ice Piedmont to the southwest and Temple Glacier to the north and east.

The ridge is named after the settlement of Topola in Northeastern Bulgaria.

Location
British mapping in 1978.

Maps
British Antarctic Territory. Scale 1:200000 topographic map. DOS 610 Series, Sheet W 64 60. Directorate of Overseas Surveys, Tolworth, UK, 1978.
 Antarctic Digital Database (ADD). Scale 1:250000 topographic map of Antarctica. Scientific Committee on Antarctic Research (SCAR), 1993–2016.

Notes

References
 Bulgarian Antarctic Gazetteer. Antarctic Place-names Commission. (details in Bulgarian, basic data in English)
Topola Ridge. SCAR Composite Antarctic Gazetteer.

External links
 Topola Ridge. Copernix satellite image

Mountains of Graham Land
Davis Coast
Bulgaria and the Antarctic